Obarzym  (Obarym), Amboroma) is a village in Gmina Dydnia, within Brzozów County, Subcarpathian Voivodeship, in south-eastern Poland.

References

Villages in Brzozów County